James Steptoe Johnston (June 9, 1843 – November 4, 1924) was an American Confederate veteran, preacher and educator. He served as a Bishop of the Episcopal Church in the United States of America. He was the last bishop of the missionary district of west Texas and the first bishop of the Diocese of West Texas. He was also the founder of TMI — The Episcopal School of Texas, a private school in San Antonio, Texas.

Biography

Early life
James Steptoe Johnston was born in 1843 in Church Hill, Jefferson County, Mississippi. He was the son of a local attorney and cotton planter James Steptoe Johnston and his wife Louisa Clarissa Bridges Newman. He was educated at Oakland College, near Rodney, Mississippi. He attended the University of Virginia in Charlottesville, Virginia, but left after one year to enlist in the Confederate States Army. While in college he was a member of the Delta Psi fraternity (AKA St. Anthony Hall ). He was commissioned as a lieutenant in the Cavalry Corps, Army of Northern Virginia in 1862. He saw action at the Second Battle of Bull Run and at Antietam before being captured by Union forces and spending one year as a prisoner of war. After the war, he studied law for a time and practiced as an attorney until 1867, and then began to read for the priesthood. He was ordained to diaconate on December 22, 1869 in Christ Church, Vicksburg, Mississippi, and to the priesthood on April 30, 1871 in Trinity Church, Natchez, Mississippi, on both occasions by William Mercer Green, Bishop of Mississippi. He then served as rector of St James' Church in Port Gibson, Mississippi between 1870 and 1876 and then rector of Ascension Church in Mount Sterling, Kentucky from 1876 until 1880. In 1880, he then became rector of Trinity Church in Mobile, Alabama. In 1887, he was elected as the second bishop of the missionary district of west Texas and was awarded a Doctorate of Divinity from the University of the South in the same year.

Career
The early years of Johnston's episcopate were difficult. The area was also experiencing severe economic difficulties due to a prolonged drought. He particularly stressed the need for an educated élite in such an environment, and to this end founded the West Texas School for Boys (now TMI — The Episcopal School of Texas) to provide a classical and Christian education for young men in the area. Johnston raised money for the school from wealthy Episcopalians on the Eastern Seaboard.

Johnston was also responsible for the integration of the district, and admitted a congregation of African-Americans who had previously been affiliated with the Methodist Church. A liberal with moderate Tractarian influences, Johnston was committed to dialogue with the Roman Catholic Church (by far the largest religious group in Southern and Western Texas) and wrote on several occasions to Vatican expressing his desire for Christian unity. In 1904, West Texas became a self-supporting diocese with Johnston as its first bishop. Johnston retired in 1916, having served for twenty-eight years as a bishop.

Death
He died at his home in San Antonio on November 4, 1924.

References

1843 births
1924 deaths
People from Jefferson County, Mississippi
Military personnel from San Antonio
Confederate States Army officers
University of Virginia alumni
Sewanee: The University of the South alumni
Episcopal bishops of West Texas